The Witzenberg Local Municipality consists of twenty-three members elected by mixed-member proportional representation. Twelve councillors are elected by first-past-the-post voting in twelve wards, while the remaining eleven are chosen from party lists so that the total number of party representatives is proportional to the number of votes received.

No party has ever received a majority at a local government election, with the African National Congress (ANC) receiving a plurality in 2006 and the Democratic Alliance (DA) in 2011, 2016 and 2021.

Results 
The following table shows the composition of the council after past elections.

December 2000 election

The following table shows the results of the 2000 election.

October 2002 floor crossing

In terms of the Eighth Amendment of the Constitution and the judgment of the Constitutional Court in United Democratic Movement v President of the Republic of South Africa and Others, in the period from 8–22 October 2002 councillors had the opportunity to cross the floor to a different political party without losing their seats. In the Witzenberg council the Democratic Alliance (DA) lost seven councillors to the New National Party (NNP), which had formerly been part of the DA, and one councillor to the African National Congress (ANC). One councillor from the "Witzenberg Onafhanklike Vereniging" and one from the Pan Africanist Congress also crossed to the ANC.

September 2004 floor crossing
Another floor-crossing period occurred on 1–15 September 2004. Two ANC councillors, the remaining DA councillor and the remaining "Witzenberg Onafhanklike Vereniging" councillor all crossed to the Independent Democrats (ID). Five of the NNP councillors crossed to the ANC, and two to the DA.

By-elections from September 2004 to February 2006
The following by-elections were held to fill vacant ward seats in the period between the floor crossing periods in September 2004 and the election in March 2006.

March 2006 election

The following table shows the results of the 2006 election.

September 2007 floor crossing
The final floor-crossing period occurred on 1–15 September 2007; floor-crossing was subsequently abolished in 2008 by the Fifteenth Amendment of the Constitution. In the Witzenberg council, one councillor crossed from the Independent Democrats (ID) to the new National People's Party, one crossed from the First Community Party to the ID, and one crossed from the African National Congress to the Democratic Alliance.

By-elections from September 2007 to May 2011
The following by-elections were held to fill vacant ward seats in the period between the floor crossing period in September 2007 and the election in May 2011.

May 2011 election

The following table shows the results of the 2011 election.

By-elections from May 2011 to August 2016
The following by-elections were held to fill vacant ward seats in the period between the elections in May 2011 and August 2016.

August 2016 election

The following table shows the results of the 2016 election.

The eleven councillors from the Democratic Alliance (DA) formed a coalition with the single councillor from the Congress of the People (COPE) to govern the municipality. The local council sends three representatives to the council of the Cape Winelands District Municipality: two from the Democratic Alliance and one from the African National Congress.

By-elections from August 2016 to November 2021
The following by-elections were held to fill vacant ward seats in the period between the elections in August 2016 and November 2021.

November 2021 election

The following table shows the results of the 2021 election.

A successful court application in December 2021 by the Democratic Alliance (DA) to recount the ballets in two wards saw the DA regain a seat from Good and regain control of the council.

By-elections from November 2021
The following by-elections were held to fill vacant ward seats in the period from November 2021.

Notes

References

Witzenberg
Elections in the Western Cape
Cape Winelands District Municipality